Scoturopsis coras is a moth of the family Notodontidae first described by Herbert Druce in 1893. It is found in Ecuador.

The larvae feed on Chusquea scandens.

References

Moths described in 1893
Notodontidae of South America